Steve Jodrell is an Australian director of theatre, film and television. He began his career in the theatre before moving into film.

As director
 The Buck's Party (1978) - short
 Shame (1988)
 Tudawali (1988) – TV movie
 Wentworth (10 episodes, 2014–2016) - TV series

As actor
 Halifax f.p. - episode 4 (1995) "My Lovely Girl"
 Lake Mungo (2008)

References

External links
 

Australian film directors
Living people
Year of birth missing (living people)